Unaula railway station is a railway station on Muzaffarpur–Gorakhpur main line under the Varanasi railway division of North Eastern Railway zone. This is situated at Unaula Awal in Gorakhpur district of the Indian state of Uttar Pradesh.

References

Railway stations in Gorakhpur district
Varanasi railway division